Arrow is a commuter rail line in San Bernardino County, California, United States. Opened on October 24, 2022, the line runs from the San Bernardino Transit Center in Downtown San Bernardino in the west to the University of Redlands in Redlands in the east.

The line was planned and constructed by the San Bernardino County Transportation Authority as the Redlands Passenger Rail Project and is operated under contract by Metrolink, which integrates Arrow into its commuter rail system making it the only line in the entire Metrolink system to be entirely in San Bernardino County and also became the second line not to serve Los Angeles Union Station nor cross the Los Angeles River since the opening of the Inland Empire-Orange County Line in October 1995.

Operation

Route 
The  route uses a former Atchison, Topeka and Santa Fe Railway line. While mostly a single track line,  of double track were constructed in the middle of the route to allow vehicles to pass each other. Low-volume freight service by BNSF uses the route during overnight hours when Arrow service is not running for a few customers located on the portion of the line just west of San Bernardino–Tippecanoe station.

Hours and frequency 
 

Most trip schedules are coordinated to allow relatively short connection times with San Bernardino Line trains at San Bernardino Transit Center for trips to and from Los Angeles. One trip early in the morning and two later in the evening will be added once Arrow receives permission to implement a quiet zone and stop sounding train horns at level crossings along the route.

Stations 

From west to east, the line starts at the San Bernardino Transit Center (also called  station), where passengers can transfer to several local and regional bus routes, Metrolink trains and the sbX bus rapid transit line, the line then makes stops at  station, crosses under Interstate 10 and enters Redlands reaching the  station, after that trains enter central Redlands serving  station, built alongside the historic Redlands Santa Fe Depot, before reaching its final stop,  station at the University of Redlands.

Rolling stock
FLIRT DMUs built by Stadler Rail were selected for service on the line under a $31.4 million contract. An additional FLIRT utilizing hydrogen fuel cell energy storage is being developed by Stadler for use on the line, with a planned introduction in 2024.

History

Previous rail service in Redlands included the Pacific Electric "Red Car" trolley system and the Atchison, Topeka and Santa Fe Railway. The PE's San Bernardino Line served Redlands from Los Angeles by way of its Eastern District, which opened in 1905 and was abandoned in 1937. Extant infrastructure includes the PE right of way, the ATSF's Redlands depot and the Redlands Trolley Barn.

Proposals for a restored passenger rail connection between San Bernardino and Redlands were made as early as the 1990s, with the service originally projected to start in 1995. This date has progressively been delayed to 2013, 2015, and 2018. The project was then known as the Redlands Passenger Rail Project.

By 2011, the estimated cost of construction was between $130 million and $150 million. The first contract for the project was awarded on November 2, 2011, by San Bernardino Associated Governments (SANBAG) to HDR, Inc. for engineering and environmental services. The contract was an amendment to an existing contract for HDR to work on a separate project in the region, the extension of the San Bernardino Line to a new terminus at the San Bernardino Transit Center.

In September 2010, the SANBAG considered options that included Metrolink train service, other types of electrified or diesel trains, and buses. In April 2011, SANBAG announced that it had settled on conventional heavy rail equipment for the service. This would be provided by refurbished ex-Metrolink rolling stock operating on 30-minute peak period headways and hourly off-peak headways. While SANBAG preferred electrified light rail, its $268.1 million cost was over the $250 million limit for the federal Small Starts transit grants that would have been used. The estimated cost of heavy rail service was $198.6 million, which could be paid for using federal transportation grants that were based on population and sales tax revenues.

The plan to use conventional heavy rail equipment faced community opposition over concerns about the noise generated by the trains. In 2015, SANBAG announced it would instead use smaller diesel multiple unit (DMUs) railcars to serve as the line's rolling stock. The line would be constructed to allow some conventional Metrolink trains to continue to Redlands–Downtown station.

The project encountered further delays, including the U.S. federal government's shutdown in October 2013, after which point the construction was slated to begin in fall of 2016. In February 2014, the project was delayed again, when a SANBAG document said that "construction is planned to begin in late 2015 with operation in 2018." In 2015, SANBAG officials said the line was expected to be complete and operating in 2020. By July 2016, construction was planned to begin in 2017 and service in 2020. In July 2016, the project received an additional $8.6 million from the U.S. Department of Transportation in the eighth round of the TIGER grant program. Ahead of the groundbreaking, the  service was officially dubbed Arrow in November 2016.

Four initial stops were proposed: two in Redlands and two in San Bernardino, with an initial projected ridership of between 1,600 and 1,800 passengers daily. A fifth station near the headquarters of Esri at New York Street were added after the company offered funds for the addition. Initial plans called for a stop at Waterman Avenue in San Bernardino next to the Inland Regional Center, but the station was later moved to Tippecanoe Avenue instead, citing higher ridership due to the Inland Regional Center's heightened security after the San Bernardino mass shooting, as well as zoning modifications near the Waterman stop.

Construction
Groundbreaking for construction on the line took place on July 19, 2019. The construction project included replacing all track on the line, rebuilding five bridges, and installing 24 grade crossings.

During the planning process, the San Bernardino County Transportation Authority (SBCTA) planned to have the area's public transit agency, Omnitrans, operate the line. But, by October 2019, Omnitrans was facing deficits that forced it to reduce service. Because of the Omnitrans' difficult financial situation, SBCTA voted to transfer the operation and construction duties to Metrolink. The route and stations were shown as an under-construction extension of the San Bernardino Line on Metrolink's transit map that month.

Ribbon cutting celebrations were held on Friday, October 21, 2022, and the line opened on Monday, October 24, 2022.

Future
Plans for future improvments to the line were drawn up during the planning process. They call for additional passing sidings to allow 15-minute peak period headways and 30-minute off-peak headways.

Service could potentially be extended along the historic Redlands Loop around Highland and San Bernardino International Airport before returning to downtown San Bernardino.

References

External links

 
 SBCTA project microsite
 Archive of SANBAG project microsite
 Rail to Redlands Working Group

Commuter rail in the United States
Public transportation in San Bernardino County, California
Transportation in San Bernardino, California
Redlands, California
University of Redlands
Railway lines opened in 2022
Metrolink (California) lines
BNSF Railway lines
Arrow (rail line)